Sphingopyxis fribergensis is a Gram-negative and aerobic bacterium from the genus of Sphingopyxis which has been isolated from soil from a meadow from Freiberg in Germany.

References

Sphingomonadales
Bacteria described in 2015